Ramchandrapur is a village in Santuri CD Block in Raghunathpur subdivision of Purulia district in the state of West Bengal, India.

Geography

Area overview
Purulia district forms the lowest step of the Chota Nagpur Plateau. The general scenario is undulating land with scattered hills. Raghunathpur subdivision occupies the northern part of the district. 83.80% of the population of the subdivision  lives in rural areas. However, there are pockets of urbanization and 16.20% of the population lives in urban areas. There are 14 census towns in the subdivision. It is presented in the map given alongside. There is a coal mining area around Parbelia and two thermal power plants are there – the 500 MW Santaldih Thermal Power Station and the 1200 MW Raghunathpur Thermal Power Station. The subdivision has a rich heritage of old temples, some of them belonging to the 11th century or earlier. The Banda Deul is a monument of national importance. The comparatively more recent in historical terms, Panchkot Raj has interesting and intriguing remains in the area.

Note: The map alongside presents some of the notable locations in the subdivision. All places marked in the map are linked in the larger full screen map.

Demographics
As per 2011 Census of India Ramchandrapur had a total population of 2,648 of which 1,374 (52%) were males and 1,274 (48%) were females. Population below 6 years was 267. The total number of literates in Ramchandrapur was 1,774 (74.51% of the population over 6 years).

Transport
Muradi is the nearest station on the Asansol-Adra line of South Eastern Railway.

Ramchandrapur Medium Irrigation Project
Muradih Dam across the Machkhandajore River, near Muraddi, was completed in 1991 as part of Ramchandrapur Medium Irrigation Project. The dam is an earthen dam 899 m long, with a concrete spillway. The maximum height above the foundation is 15 m. Baranti, a small village 6 km from Muradi railway station and near the dam, has become a popular tourist attraction.

Healthcare
Ramchandrapur Netaji Eye and General Hospital, functioning under the Health and Family Welfare department of the Government of West Bengal, established in 1953, is a 242 bedded eye care institution.  10,790 patients are treated in-door annually and 130,000 patients attend the Out Patient’s Department.

References

External links

Villages in Purulia district